Muthuthala is a small town, village and gram panchayat. It lies northwest of Pattambi in Palakkad district, of the state of Kerala, India. It is located on the banks of the Bharathapuzha River. 
The infrastructure of the panchayath is divided into Kodumunda and Muthuthala.Muthuthala, Kodumunda and Karakkuth are important centres. The adjacent villages to Muthuthala are Pallippuram, Koppam and Pattambi. The major institutions are GOHSS Pattambi, GHSS Kodumunda, GLPS Kodumunda AMLP Kodumunda, Aups muthuthala, Aups perumudiyoor, SBI muthuthala etc. Also there are temples such as sree muthassiyar kavu, ayappan kavu, Ganapthi temple muthuthala. Siva temple perumudiyoor, kozhikottii temple etc. The main Islamic symbol of this village is Muhyidheen Juma Masjid located at Muthuthala centre. An Islamic educational institution named as Thanveerul Islam Madrassa is also running near to this. Thes agnostoma somayagam is conducted at perumudiyoor on 2016. Lakhs of people visited there. Major cultivation is paddy here. Banana and rubber plantations are also abundant here.

Demographics
 India census, Muthuthala had a population of 21,496 with 10,297 males and 11,199 females.

Important trading center

Kodumunda
Karakkuthangadi
Muthuthala

Transportation

Waterways
There had been a trade link passing through the River Bharathapuzha. Varantakuttikkatavu was a ferry point which was connecting Thrithala, the local market place and Kodumunda, one of the market place in muthuthala now there is no water transportation available by the coming of new roads. About fifteen years back small boats and rafts are a major scene of this area.

Road

The village, located 8 km from Pattambi on the Pattambi-Pallippuram Road, and can be reached by road and rail. The road from Pattambi forks in two directions at the Muthuthala junction. One road goes to Pallippuram and the other one reaches the state highway to Perinthalmanna at Trithala Koppam junction. A diversion from Parakkad, a local village connects Perinthalmanna- Pattambi state highway at Sankaramangalam.

Rail

Kodumunda is the only railway station in Muthuthala, which is en route to Kozhikode on the Shoranur–Kozhikode railway line.  Only a few passenger trains halt at this station, so the preferable means to reach Muthuthala is by road. Pattambi is the main railway station nearby where most of the trains do have a stopping.

Photos

References

Muthuthala - Election Details
Muthuthala - Watershed Programme

Villages in Palakkad district
Gram panchayats in Palakkad district